Terence George Branston (25 July 1938 – 22 December 2010) was an English footballer, most noted as a player for Northampton Town and Luton Town.

Playing career

Joining Northampton Town in October 1958, Branston did not make his debut until 1960. The tough-tackling centre-back helped Northampton sweep from Division Four to Division One in successive seasons. When Northampton started to fall back as quickly as they had emerged, Branston left to join Allan Brown's Luton Town in 1967.

Branston was made club captain on arrival, and skippered Luton to the Fourth Division title during his first season with the club. He led them to a further promotion two years later, before moving on to Lincoln City. After three years with Lincoln, he moved into semi-retirement; combining his driving school in Rugby with non-League football at Nuneaton Borough.

Branston died of brain cancer on 22 December 2010.

References

External links
 

1938 births
2010 deaths
English Football League players
English footballers
Northampton Town F.C. players
Luton Town F.C. players
Lincoln City F.C. players
Nuneaton Borough F.C. players
Association football defenders
Sportspeople from Rugby, Warwickshire